Strzelczyk is a gender-neutral Polish surname. Notable people with the surname include:

Jerzy Strzelczyk (born 1941), Polish historian
Justin Strzelczyk (1968–2004), American football offensive tackle

Polish-language surnames